Lawrence Desmond Taylor (born 23 November 1947) is an English former footballer who played as a goalkeeper.

Career
Taylor began his career at Bristol Rovers in 1965, making 90 Football League appearances for the club over the course of five years. In 1970, Taylor signed for Chelmsford City, where he played until 1976.

References

1947 births
Living people
Association football wingers
English footballers
Sportspeople from Exeter
Bristol Rovers F.C. players
Chelmsford City F.C. players
English Football League players